Human Design is a New Age-inspired pseudo-scientific practice. Its proponents describe it as a holistic self-knowledge system. Its effectiveness has not been confirmed by peer reviewed research.

Human Design combines astrology, the I Ching, Kabbalah and Vedic philosophy, centering around the division of personalities into five energy types alleged to indicate how someone is supposed to exchange energy with the world: Manifestors, Generators, Manifesting Generators, Projectors, and Reflectors. It was originated by Alan Robert Krakower who published a book called The Human Design System under the pseudonym Ra Uru Hu in 1992. Krakower developed the Human Design system following a mystical experience in 1987. Human Design purports to be a self-knowledge method which does not have any specific religious dogma or affiliation. Despite this, it has been described by theologian J. R. Hustwit as a "transreligious project" that is "breathtaking in scope" and synthesizes seven or more traditions. It has also been described as a psychological counseling instrument and "the new astrology." 

In Human Design analysis, planets are displayed in a type of horoscope called a bodygraph. The bodygraph shows the 64 hexagrams of the I Ching at various locations on the body. It is sometimes shown within a mandala, overlaid on the 12 signs of the zodiac. Human Design also addresses dietary regimen and ideal environments for living, working and relationships.

In addition, it claims to facilitate "deep access to bodily, generational and inter-dimensional intelligence."

References 

Astrology